Ecotone may refer to:
Ecotone, transition area between two adjacent ecological communities (ecosystems)
Ecotone (Six Feet Under episode), the title of Episode 509 of Six Feet Under
Ecotone, a literary magazine published by the University of North Carolina Wilmington